Eternal return is a philosophical concept.

Eternal return may also refer to:

 Eternal return (Eliade), a term used by the historian of religion Mircea Eliade
 The Eternal Return (album), a 2009 album by Darkest Hour
 The Eternal Return of Antonis Paraskevas, a 2013 Greek film
 Eternal Return (Sarah Blasko album), 2015
 Eternal Return (Windhand album), 2018
 Eternal Return (video game), a 2020 video game

See also
 Eternal Recurrence (disambiguation)